"Hymne Monégasque", also known as  ("The March of Monaco"), is the national anthem of Monaco. It was originally adopted in 1848 with French lyrics by Théophile Bellando de Castro and music by Bellando and Castil-Blaze. The current official lyrics, which are in Monégasque, were written in 1931 by Louis Notari, while the current musical arrangement was composed in 1914 by Léon Jehin.

History
Monégasque lawyer Théophile Bellando de Castro wrote French lyrics and composed the music of the first version of the "Hymne Monégasque" in 1841. Later, French musicologist Castil-Blaze modified the melody and made several other minor changes. In 1848, the National Guard, created by Prince Florestan, adopted Bellando's song, and it became the "March of the National Loyalists". In 1896, a new arrangement for piano composed by Monégasque composer Charles Albrecht was published by Tihebaux in Paris and titled "Air National de Monaco". In 1897, Decourcelle, a publisher in Nice, printed a new version of Albrecht's composition numbered 429 and titled "Hymne National de Monaco".

Years later, Monégasque musician François Bellini orchestrated the song by Albrecht; this new arrangement for a trio was judged to be too long for people in 1900 and ceased being played. The modern version was created by French composer Léon Jehin in 1914 and was played for the first time during the 25th anniversary of the beginning Prince Albert's reign. Finally, in 1931, Monégasque poet Louis Notari wrote the lyrics in the Monégasque language.

Fernand Bertrand of the Comité National des Traditions Monégasques (National Committee of Monégasque Traditions) later simplified the Monégasque lyrics while retaining the meaning, because people were finding it difficult to sing the first verse, which had a fast rhythm. Bertrand also noted that the second verse was no longer being played or sung. This is the version currently taught in schools to children and that almost all the population sings today.

Lyrics 
Only the Monegasque lyrics are official, reportedly dating back to a request from the Prince. The national anthem is rarely sung aloud at all in Monaco, except at official occasions.

Current lyrics 
Sometimes, a version of these lyrics is sung that does not include the verse in the middle, which instead is left as an instrumental interlude.

Full lyrics (1928)

Original lyrics (1841)

See also 

 List of national anthems

Notes

References

External links 
 Hymne monégasque
 The Prince's Palace - The official website of the Prince's Palace has an extensive article about the National Anthem, featuring the complete lyrics and an instrumental sound file.
 Gare de Monaco - The  official website for the Monaco Monte Carlo train station features a page of videos of the inauguration ceremony for its 1999 reopening, including a choral version of the national anthem.
 Streaming audio, lyrics and information for Monaco's national anthem (archive link)

National symbols of Monaco
Monegasque songs
European anthems
National anthems
National anthem compositions in A-flat major